Solid Fuel Ducted Ramjet (SFDR) is a missile propulsion system currently being developed by the Defence Research and Development Organisation of India. The project aims to develop critical technologies required in the propulsion systems of future Indian long range air-to-air missiles.

Description 
The Solid Fuel Ducted Ramjet is a missile propulsion system that includes a thrust modulated ducted rocket with a reduced smoke nozzle-less missile booster. The thrust modulation in the system is achieved using a hot gas flow controller. The system utilises a solid fuelled air-breathing ramjet engine. It is an extremely long-range missile with a projected range of 350 km. As per International Institute for Strategic Studies (IISS), this kind of propulsion system drastically enhances the range with higher average speed. The missiles which use such system are also able to carry larger payload due to absence of an oxidiser. Unlike solid-propellant rocket, the Ramjet takes up oxygen from the atmosphere during flight.

Officially, the technology is being developed to power future Indian air-to-air missiles. However, the technology can also be applied to surface-to-air missiles.

In its current form, the SFDR-based missile first requires to be boosted into a high-altitude trajectory to simulate aircraft-launch conditions. Subsequently, the nozzle-less booster fires up and guides the missile through its desired trajectory.

Development 
The development of the SFDR started in 2013 and envisaged a five-year deadline to begin actual demonstrations. The missile is being developed primarily by the Defence Research and Development Laboratory (DRDL) and Research Centre Imarat (RCI) in Hyderabad. High Energy Material Research Laboratory (HEMRL) developed the nozzle-less booster while the ramjet engine is being developed with Russian assistance. Ground-based testing of the missile started in 2017.

Testing 

 SFDR was tested for the first time on 30 May 2018. This test demonstrated a nozzle-less booster for the first time in India. The Economic Times reported that the missile had failed to activate the second ramjet engine stage during the test.
The second test of the missile occurred on 8 February 2019, where its ramjet engine was successfully tested. The missile finally touched the ground after achieving the desired Mach number.
 DRDO conducts successful flight test of Solid Fuel Ducted Ramjet Technology in Odisha's Chandipur on 5 March 2021. "All subsystems, including the ground booster motor, performed as per our expectations", DRDO officials said.
 Another successful test was carried out on 8 April 2022 .The test demonstrated reliable functioning of all critical components involved in the complex missile system and met all the mission objectives.

See also 

 Astra (missile)
 K-100 (missile)

References

External links 

Defence Research and Development Organisation
Air-to-air missiles of India
Guided missiles of India